School District 28 Quesnel is a school district in central British Columbia. Most schools are located in Quesnel with one outlying school in Wells, a small community near the historic gold mining town of Barkerville and another school in the community of Nazko which is 100 km west of Quesnel.

History
There are no working schools in Barkerville BC, nor have there been since the 1930s.  The school is located in the town of Wells, BC.  Wells is 8 km away from Barkerville and is also a historic mining town – although not a ghost town as Barkerville had become. Barkerville is a historic park, reminiscent from the time of the Gold Rush, and has a school house that puts on "classes" in the visitor season, which is June–September.  The classes are not official but merely a dramatization of what the school house might have been in the time of the Gold Rush.

Quesnel "Gold Pan City" is now the largest of the three cities and the home of the school district's head office and most of its schools.

Schools

See also
List of school districts in British Columbia

Cariboo
28